The SAI KZ VIII was an aerobatic sport aircraft first built in Denmark in 1949. Designed by Björn Andreasson, it was a low-wing cantilever monoplane of conventional configuration with fixed tailwheel undercarriage and a single seat. The first KZ VIII was custom-built by SAI for the Danish aerobatic display team Sylvest Jensen Luftcirkus, in which Peter Steen piloted the aircraft in some 50 performances in  summer 1950. At the same time a full set of parts for a second aircraft was produced but this was not assembled until 1959. In 1996 another was completed by amateur builder Hardy Vad, powered by a flat-four engine.

Specifications

See also

References

External links

 Danmarks Flymuseum page on the KZ VIII (in Danish)
 Уголок неба

1940s Danish sport aircraft
Skandinavisk Aero Industri aircraft
Aerobatic aircraft
Low-wing aircraft
Single-engined tractor aircraft
Aircraft first flown in 1949